Mud Lake may refer to one of more than seventy lakes of the same name in Ontario, Canada, including:

Mud Lake (Bruce County)
Renfrew County
Mud Lake (Blithfield Township)
Mud Lake (Brougham Township)

See also
Mud Lake, Ontario, a community in the municipality of North Algona Wilberforce, Renfrew County